Wild Women is a 1970 American Made-for-television Western film directed by Don Taylor and starring Hugh O'Brian, Anne Francis and Marilyn Maxwell. The film was originally a television pilot that appeared on the ABC Movie of the Week.

The movie premiered on October 20, 1970.  When it was rerun during the summer 1971 rerun season, it was the most viewed primetime broadcast for the week, with a 26.3 rating.

The Los Angeles Times called it "diverting entertainment".

Plot
A band of boisterous paroled female prisoners accompanies Army engineers on an undercover map-making assignment into or near Mexican territory.  Their cover story is that the group consists of settlers; each of the women is paired with one of the engineers to appear to be his wife.

Cast
 Hugh O'Brian as Killian 
 Anne Francis as Jean Marshek
 Marilyn Maxwell as Maude Webber
 Marie Windsor as Lottie Clampett
 Sherry Jackson as Nancy Belacourt 
 Robert F. Simon as Col. Donahue
 Richard Kelton as Cpt. Charring 
 Cynthia Hull as Mit-O-Ne
 Pepe Callahan as Lt. Santos, the Mexican
 Ed Call as Sgt. Frame 
 John A. Neris as Sgt. Flmer Cass (as John Neris)
 Pepe Callahan as Lt. Santos
 Troy Melton as Cpl. Isham
 Joseph Kaufmann as Pvt. Bishop
 Chuck Hicks as Cpl. Hearn
 Jim Boles as Warden
 Michael Keep as Cadete, the Mescalero

References

External links
Wild Women at IMDb

1970 television films
1970 films
ABC Movie of the Week
Films directed by Don Taylor